The 2021 Rugby Europe Under-18 Sevens Championship took place in Gdańsk between 17-18 July. France were named Champions after trouncing Russia 38–0 in the final.

Teams

Pool stages

Pool A

Pool B

Finals 
Cup

Ranking Final for 5th & 7th Place

Final standings

References 

2021
2021 rugby sevens competitions
2021 in European sport
Rugby Europe Under-18 Sevens
Rugby Europe Under-18 Sevens